is a town located in Takaoka District, Kōchi Prefecture, Japan.

Geography
Yusuhara is located in the northwestern part of Kōchi Prefecture, on the island of Shikoku,  at the western end of the Shikoku Mountains. Surrounded by mountains on all sides, forests cover 91% of the town's area.

Neighbouring municipalities 
Kōchi Prefecture
 Tsuno
 Shimanto
Ehime Prefecture
 Seiyo
  Kumakōgen
 Kihoku

Climate
Yusuhara has a humid subtropical climate (Köppen climate classification Cfa) with hot, humid summers and cool winters. There is significant precipitation throughout the year, especially during June and July.

Demographics
Per Japanese census data, the population of Yusuhara in 2020 is 3,307 people. Yusuhara has been conducting censuses since 1920.

History 
As with all of Kōchi Prefecture, the area of Yusuhara was part of ancient Tosa Province.  During the Edo period, the area was part of the holdings of Tosa Domain ruled by the Yamauchi clan from their seat at Kōchi Castle. The village of Yusuhara was established with the creation of the modern municipalities system on October 1, 1889. It was raised to town status on November 4, 1966. It was designated as a "Environmental model city" in 2009.

Government
Yusuhara has a mayor-council form of government with a directly elected mayor and a unicameral town council of seven members. Yusuhara, together with the municipalities of Nakatosa, Tsuno and Shimanto, contributes two members to the Kōchi Prefectural Assembly. In terms of national politics, the town is part of Kōchi 2nd district of the lower house of the Diet of Japan.

Economy
The economy of Yusuhara is almost entirely agricultural and forestry. The town produces most of its own electricity via wind power, solar power and small hydroelectric turbines.

Education
Yusuhara has one public combined elementary/middle school operated by the village government, and one public high school operated by the Kōchi Prefectural Board of Education.

Transportation

Railway 
The town does not have any passenger railroad service.  The nearest passenger railway station is Susaki Station in Susaki.

Highways

References

External links

Yusuhara official website 

Towns in Kōchi Prefecture
Environmental model cities